William Henry Fitchett (9 August 1841 – 25 May 1928) was an Australian journalist, minister, newspaper editor, educator and founding president of the Methodist Ladies' College, Melbourne.

Early life
Fitchett was born in Grantham, Lincolnshire, England, third son of William Fitchett, a perfumer, hairdresser, clog and Patten-maker, toy-dealer and Wesleyan preacher. He came with his parents to Australia in 1854, his father died in 1851. Fitchett first worked in a quarry near Geelong, then became a jackaroo on a station in Queensland, and largely self-educated, entered the Methodist ministry in 1866.

Minister and educator
Fitchett's first parish was at Mortlake, Victoria, and for 16 years he was a circuit minister at Echuca, Bendigo, South Yarra and Hawthorn. He continued his studies after entering the ministry and in 1876 took the degree of B.A. at the University of Melbourne. In 1878 he moved and carried a resolution at the Methodist conference that a committee should be appointed to seriously consider the question of starting a secondary school which would do for girls what Wesley College was doing for boys. Nothing was done at the time but in the following year he became secretary of a new committee which, after three years work, succeeded in starting the Methodist Ladies' College at Hawthorn. The financial difficulties were great but they were overcome, Fitchett became the first principal and held the position for 46 years. Under his guidance it developed into one of the largest and most successful girls' schools in Australia.

He also served as President-General of the Methodist Church of Australasia from 1904 to 1907.

Literary career
Fitchett at this time had already entered journalism, having during the seventies contributed a regular column to the Spectator, the Methodist church paper, signed XYZ. Some time later he became editor of the Southern Cross, a Sunday magazine for the home, and held this position until his death, a period of over 40 years. Articles by him appeared in its pages a month before he died. From 1883 to 1892, when it ceased publication, he was editor of the Melbourne Daily Telegraph. But what really brought him before the general public was a series of articles published in The Argus, under the title of Deeds that Won the Empire. They were collected and published in book form in Melbourne in 1896 and by Smith Elder and Company, London, in 1897. The book eventually ran into 35 printings, and about 250,000 copies were sold. Similar volumes (many under the pseudonym "Vedette") followed in steady succession:
 Fights for the Flag (1898)
 Wellington's Men (1900)
 The Tale of the Great Mutiny (1901)
 Nelson and his Captains (1902)
 The New World of the South: Australia in the making (1903)
 How England Saved Europe, 4 vols. (1909)
 The Great Duke, 2 vols. (1911)
 The Romance of Australian History (1913)

Fitchett also produced four volumes of fiction:
 The Commander of the Hirondelle (1904)
 Ithuriel's Spear (1906)
 A Pawn in the Game (1908)
 The Adventures of an Ensign (1917)

Also four books on religion:
 The Unrealized Logic of Religion (1905)
 Wesley and his Century (1906)
 The Beliefs of Unbelief (1908)
 Where the Higher Criticism Fails (1922)

Other literary work included the editorships of the Australasian Review of Reviews (which he quit over an argument with the proprietor, W. T. Stead), and of Life, a popular magazine first published in 1904 by Fitchett Bros. Pty. Ltd., which he edited for 11 years.

These activities were not allowed to interfere with Fitchett's life work. First and foremost he was principal of a great school for girls steadily expanding, with problems continually arising which required his careful attention. His writing was done in the early hours of the day much of it before breakfast, and the Methodist Church as a whole called for much interest and thought. Towards the end of the nineteenth century it was split into five sections and many efforts were made to bring a union of them about. In 1895 Fitchett, as president of the conference of 1895, organised a public demonstration in favour of the union. The question came up again at successive yearly conferences, but it was difficult to obtain the requisite two-thirds majority. In 1898 union was decided upon, the necessary Act of Parliament was passed, and at the conference of 1902 the union was accomplished and Fitchett was elected the first president of the united church. Another of his interests was the State Library of Victoria of which he was a trustee for 35 years.

Death and legacy
Fitchett died at the school on 25 May 1928 from a haemorrhage of a duodenal ulcer. He married twice: firstly in 1870 to Clara Shaw, who died in 1915 and secondly to the widow of the Rev. William Williams. He had five sons and one daughter of the first marriage. A brother, Dr Frederick Fitchett, C.M.G., was at one time attorney-general of New Zealand, and another brother, Dr Alfred Fitchett, was dean of Dunedin, New Zealand.

References

Welch, Ian and Stuart, John
"William Henry Fitchett: Methodist, Englishman, Australian, Imperialist", Social Sciences and Missions (Leiden: Brill), Volume 21/1. 2008, pp. 57–72

Additional sources listed by the Australian Dictionary of Biography:
P. L. Brown (ed), Clyde Company Papers, vol 5 (Lond, 1963); Table Talk (Melbourne), 12 August 1892; Spectator (Melbourne), 8, 29 March 1895; Life (Melbourne), Dec 1904 – Mar 1905; Methodist Recorder (London), 3 August 1899, 27 July 1905; The Age (Melbourne), 7 December 1904; Argus (Melbourne), 7, 8, 10, 12 December 1904, 8–11 Apr 1905, 26, 28, 29 May 1928; Sydney Morning Herald, 26 May, 18 August 1928; Southern Cross (Melbourne), 8 June 1928; Fitchett travel notes, 1891, and MLC, Kew, Melbourne, Council minutes (held at school); Sir Samuel Way letter book, Nov 1897 – Aug 1898, PRG 30/5/4 (State Records of South Australia);

External links

 
 

1841 births
1928 deaths
Australian Methodist ministers
Australian educational theorists
Australian journalists
Australian editors
Australian historians
People from Grantham
English emigrants to Australia